The Public Accounts Committee (Malay: Jawatankuasa Kira-Kira Wang Negara) (PAC) is a select committee of the House of Representatives in the Parliament of Malaysia. The PAC derives its powers from the Dewan Rakyat which chooses the committee chairperson and deputy chairperson. Based on Standing Order 77(1), the PAC has the power to examine the accounts of the Malaysian government, the accounts of all public authorities, the reports of the auditor-general, and any other matters that "the committee may think fit" or matters referred to the PAC by the Dewan Rakyat.

Since 2018, the PAC has always made decisions by consensus. The PAC is a bi-partisan committee composed of two members from DAP, Bersatu, PAS, and UMNO with one member each from PKR, Amanah, Warisan and PBB.

Mandate
Examine the accounts of the Federation and the appropriation of the sums granted by Parliament to meet the public expenditure.
Examine such accounts of public authorities and other bodies administering public funds as may be laid before the House of Representatives.
Examine reports of the Auditor-General laid before the House of Representatives in accordance with Article 107 of the Federal Constitution.
Examine such other matters as the Committee may think fit, or which may be referred to the Committee by the House of Representatives.
Review and report on the Public Accounts of Malaysia.
Examine all reports of the Auditor General of Malaysia.

Investigations
The PAC's primary instrument is conducting hearings. The first step is to invite the controlling officer of the government ministry related to the investigation subject. If the officer's explanation suffices, the matter ends there. If not, the PAC will summon the cabinet minister and, if necessary, other witnesses such as the National Audit Department or project contractors. Complicated cases such as the LCS Saga required 10 hearing days and 21 witnesses.

Once the hearings are concluded, the PAC secretariat will begin a three-stage drafting process. Firstly, the secretariat will compile a report based on the Hansard (official parliamentary transcripts) and start writing a draft report. The second stage involves a "housekeeping meeting", where the secretariat will read out the entire report for the PAC's scrutiny. Any amendments will be done at this stage which is why the report takes many days to finalise. Every decision is by consensus. There were no heated arguments because facts and figures are being presented to all members. Everyone has the freedom to air their views. Eventually, the PAC will reach a consensus. Once the final draft is completed, the third stage involves a final verification process where PAC members will be given a chance to go through the entire report one more time before it goes to print.

Membership

15th Parliament

14th Parliament

13th Parliament

12th Parliament

11th Parliament

10th Parliament

9th Parliament

8th Parliament

7th Parliament

6th Parliament

5th Parliament

4th Parliament

3rd Parliament

2nd Parliament

1st Parliament

Notes

References

External links
 

Parliament of Malaysia
Committees of the Parliament of Malaysia
Committees of the Dewan Rakyat
Malaysia